The 1952 Albanian National Championship was the fifteenth season of the Albanian National Championship, the top professional league for association football clubs, since its establishment in 1930.

Overview
It was contested by 21 teams, and Dinamo won the championship.

Qualification round

Group A

Group B

Group C

Final round

League table

References
Albania - List of final tables (RSSSF)

Kategoria Superiore seasons
1
Albania
Albania